The 1902–03 season was Madrid Football Club's 1st season in existence. The club played some friendly matches against local clubs. Madrid FC also played their first match outside of the Community of Madrid against Club Español de Fútbol (now RCD Espanyol) in Barcelona. The club also participated in the inaugural editions of the Copa del Rey and the Campeonato de Madrid (Madrid Championship).

Summary

 6 March: After a new Board presided by Juan Padrós had been elected, Madrid Football Club was officially founded.
 9 March: Madrid FC played its first-ever match. The match was played between two teams of Madrid FC players between the streets of Alcalá and Goya, next to the old Plaza de Toros in Madrid. The two teams wore blue and red respectively. A. Meléndez, Juan Padrós, A. Spottorno, Gorostizaga, Mendía, Páramo, Neyra, A. Giralt, F. Palacios, Martens and Rodero played for the blue team. José Giralt, Meléndez, Molera, Salvador, Valcárcel, M. Spottorno, Stampher, Juan Palacios, Varela, Celada and Bueno played for the red team. The blue team won the match 1–0.
 2 May: Madrid FC played its first match against another club in a friendly against New Foot-Ball Club that ended in a 1–1 draw.
 13 May: The first ever match between Madrid FC and FC Barcelona was held. This was also Madrid FC's first competitive match. Arthur Johnson scored the club's first competitive goal in a 1–3 loss to Barça.
 16 May: Madrid FC secured its first competitive victory defeating Club Español de Football (now RCD Espanyol) 3–2.
 23 May: Alfonso Albéniz was the first player to leave Barcelona in order to join Madrid.
 11 August: Madrid won two ceramic plates that represent the first trophy in its history. Part of the programme in the festivities at El Escorial featured a match between Madrid and Moncloa, the clash ended with a 6–5 score favourable to Madrid.
 24 February 1903: Madrid FC played their first match outside of the Community of Madrid against Club Español de Fútbol in Barcelona.
 6 April: Madrid FC played its first official competitive match and first Copa del Rey match.
 8 April: The inaugural Copa del Rey final marked the first ever match between Madrid FC and Athletic Bilbao.

Players

Source:

Unofficial

Friendlies

Concurso de Bandas

Trofeo Codorniú

Competitions

Overview

Copa de la Coronación

The 1902 Copa de la Coronación, officially Concurso Madrid de Foot-ball Association (Madrid Contest of Association Football)  was an unofficial football competition in honour of the coronation of Alfonso XIII of Spain. It is not recognized by the Royal Spanish Football Federation or the Liga de Fútbol Profesional (LFP).

Copa del Rey

Campeonato de Madrid

The 1902–03 Campeonato de Madrid was the inaugural edition of the Campeonato Regional Centro. Despite beginning in November 1903, it corresponds to the 1902–03 Spanish football season.

League table

Matches

References

External links

International Friendlies of Real Madrid CF - Overview
Spanish Championship (Copa) 1902-1909 annulled

Spanish football clubs 1902–03 season
1902–03